Yuryev-Polsky is an old town and the administrative center of Yuryev-Polsky District of Vladimir Oblast, Russia, located in the upper reaches of the Koloksha River,  northwest of Vladimir, the administrative center of the oblast. Population:     23,000 (1974).

History
It was founded by Yury Dolgoruky in 1152. First part of its name derives from Yury's patron saint, St. George. The second part is derived from the word polsky meaning "in the fields". This specification was needed in order to distinguish the town from the earlier established fortress of Yuryev (nowadays Tartu), at the time located in the woods in what is now Estonia and then the biggest Russian settlement in the territory of the Chuds.

Upon Vsevolod III's death in 1212, the town was assigned to one of his youngest sons, Svyatoslav. It was that prince who personally designed the town's chief landmark, the Cathedral of St. George (1230–1234). It is the latest pre-Mongol construction in Russia, unprecedented in abundance of stone sculptures, and also the model for first stone churches in the Moscow Kremlin. In the 1460s, the cathedral's dome collapsed, thus burying most of unique sculptures which had adorned the cathedral walls. The collapsed roof was sloppily restored by a well-known Muscovite artisan, Vasili Yermolin, in 1471.

The great Battle of Lipitsa was fought near the town in 1216. In 1238, Yuryev was sacked by the Mongols. A century later, it was incorporated into the Grand Duchy of Moscow. The chief monument of the Muscovite period is the walled Monastery of Archangel Michael, founded in the 13th century and containing various buildings from the 17th and 18th centuries. Several miles from Yuryev, on the bank of the Yakhroma River, stands the Kosmin Cloister, whose structures are typical for the mid-17th century.

Administrative and municipal status
Within the framework of administrative divisions, Yuryev-Polsky serves as the administrative center of Yuryev-Polsky District, to which it is directly subordinated. As a municipal division, the town of Yuryev-Polsky is incorporated within Yuryev-Polsky Municipal District as Yuryev-Polsky Urban Settlement.

Twin towns – sister cities
Yuryev-Polsky is twinned with:

  Hîncești, Moldova

References

Notes

Sources

External links

 Unofficial website of Yuryev-Polsky
Picture of Kosmin Cloister

Cities and towns in Vladimir Oblast
Yuryevsky Uyezd (Vladimir Governorate)
Golden Ring of Russia
1152 establishments in Europe
12th-century establishments in Russia